Christopher Casey "C.C." Swiney (born August 13, 1981) is a writer, actor and comedian in the film and television industry.

He was born in Big Stone Gap, Virginia, to Joyce and Tate Swiney.

Swiney attended Powell Valley High School and received his bachelor's degree from Carson-Newman College. He completed his master's degree at the University of Arkansas at Fayetteville.

He got his start at 3-Ball productions as he became a film logger for the television series Dear Santa, Taradise, Medical Miracles and The Biggest Loser.  He was quickly promoted to a Story Producer for Mentorn Productions and Fox Reality.

As an actor, Swiney has been in over 100 live theater productions and was a principal character in a movie with Wet City Productions titled, "Urbana", written and directed by Joshua Aaron Weinstein. Currently, Swiney is managed by his wife, Stephanie Dozier. He is a professional stand-up comedian and actor. He also works as Director of Operations at Nyko.

Recently, he helped produce the documentary Great American Race Test. He also writes for the television series Work Out.

He was a quarter finalist in the 1999 National Forensic Association Tournament.

References

External links

 http://tv.yahoo.com/c-c-swiney/contributor/2173506
 https://web.archive.org/web/20081203073954/http://www.wetcityproductions.com/
 https://web.archive.org/web/20080609192333/http://www.urbanafilm.com/aboutfilm.html

1981 births
Male actors from Virginia
Musicians from Virginia
Writers from Virginia
Living people
People from Big Stone Gap, Virginia
Carson–Newman University alumni
University of Arkansas alumni